The list of frigates by country includes all modern (post–1940) frigates organized by the country of which they were in service.

Argentina (Armada de la República Argentina) 
 Azopardo class - 2 ships (1957-1973)
 Almirante Brown class - 4 ships in service 1983
 Espora class - 6 ships in service 1985

Australia (Royal Australian Navy) 
 River class - 6 ships (all 6 decommissioned)
 Adelaide class - 6 ships (all 6 decommissioned)
 Anzac class - 8 ships built 1993-2004
 Hunter class - 9 ships ordered

Bangladesh (Bangladesh Navy) 
 Bangabandhu class - 1 ship (Ulsan Class)
 Osman class - 1 ship (ex-Chinese 'Jianghu I' class)
 Abu Bakr class - 2 ships (Type 053H2 Class Frigate)
 Umar Faruq class - 2 ship (ex-British Salisbury class) (decommissioned)
 Hamilton class - 2 ships (ex- USCGC Jarvis and USCGC Rush)
 Type-053H class-(4 ships)(2 have been launched and 2 more are on order)

Belgium 
 Wielingen class - 3 ships (sold to Bulgaria)

Brazil 
 Greenhalgh class - 2 ships active (ex-UK Broadsword class (Batch 1))
 Niteroi class - 6 ships built (1975–86)
 Para class - all retired

Bulgaria 
 Koni class - 1 ship (ex-Russian Delfin)
 Wielingen class - 3 ships (in Bulgarian Navy often designated as Drazki (Daring) class)

Canada (Royal Canadian Navy) 
 River class — 60 ships - all retired
 Loch class — 3 ships
 Halifax class - 12 ships Refit 2010-2017

Chile (Armada de Chile) 
 Type 22 Boxer class (Batch 2) - 1 ship, 2003
 Jacob van Heemskerck class - 2 ships, 2006
 Karel Doorman class - 2/2 ships, 2006, 2007
 Type 23 Duke class — 2/3 ships 2006, 2007, 2008

China (People's Liberation Army Navy) 
 Zuhai class - 1 ship
 Jinan class - 15 ships
 Type 053H/H1 Xiamen (Jianghu I/II) class - 21 ships
 Type 053H2 Huangshi (Jianghu III) class - 3 ships
 Type 053HT-H Siping (Jianghu IV) class - 1 ship
 Type 053H1G Zigong (Jianghu V) class - 6 ships
 Type 053H2G Anqing (Jiangwei) class - 4 ships
 Type 053H3 (Jiangwei II) class - 8 ships
 Type 054 (Jiangkai I) class - 2 ships
 Type 054A (Jiangkai II) class - 22 ships (2 more are fitting out, and another 2 are under construction)

Colombia (Armada Nacional de Colombia) 
 Almirante Padilla class - 4 ships

Cuba 
 Tacoma class - 3 ships
 Koni class - 3 ships
 Rio Damuji class - 2 ships

Denmark 
 Holger Danske class - 2 ships (ex-Canadian River class)
 Esbern Snare class - 3 ships (ex-British Hunt Type II class) 
  OPV - 4 ships, classed as ocean patrol frigates.
 Beskytteren-ocean patrol frigate OPV. (classed as ocean patrol frigates). Later sold to Estonia and renamed EML Admiral Pitka (A230)
 Peder Skram class - 2 ships
 Thetis-class ocean patrol frigate- - 4 ships
 Absalon-class flexible support ship - 2 ships. (Arguably a support ship, armed as a frigate)
 Iver Huitfeldt class - 3 ships

Ecuador 
 Eloy Alfaro class - 2 ships (ex-British Leander class)

Egypt 
 Mubarak class - 4 ships (ex-US Oliver Hazard Perry class)
 FREMM Aquitaine class - 1 ship
 FREMM Bergamini class - 2 ships
 MEKO 200 class - 4 ships
 Damyat class - 2 ships (ex-US Knox class)
 Najim al Zafir class - 2 ships (ex-Chinese 'Jianghu' class)
 El Fateh class - 1 ship (ex-British destroyer Zenith)
 Tariq class - 1 ship (ex-British sloop Whimbrel)

France (Marine Nationale) 
 Cassard class - 2 ships, due to be decommissioned around 2020-2022.
 Georges Leygues class - 7 ships
 La Fayette class - 5 ships commissioned 1996
 Floreal class - 6 ships
 Commandant Rivière class - 9 ships decommissioned

Germany (Deutsche Marine) 
 F120 Köln class - 6 ships retired
 F122 Bremen class - 8 ships 1980's
 F123 Brandenburg class - 4 ships 1990's
 F124 Sachsen class - 3 newest heavy frigate (replacing destroyers)
 F125 Baden-Württemberg class - 4 ships, in service by 2017 (replacing Bremen class)

Greece (Hellenic Navy) 
 Elli class - 10 ships (ex-Dutch Kortenaer class)
 Hydra class - 4 ships commissioned 1992-98

India (Indian Navy) 
  - 6 decommissioned
  - 3 decommissioned
  - 3 active
 Talwar class - 6 active, 3 under construction, 1 more planned
  - 3 active
 Nilgiri-class frigate (2019) - 7 under construction

Indonesia (Tentara Nasional Indonesia-Angkatan Laut) 
 Imam Bondjol class - 2 ships, retired 1978
 Riga class - 8 ships, retired 1973-1986
 Samadikun class - 4 ships (ex-US Claud Jones class), retired 2001-2009
 Martha Khristina Tiyahahu class - 3 ships (ex-UK Tribal class), retired 2000
 Ahmad Yani class - 6 ships (ex-Dutch Van Speijk class), 1 ship retired in 2019
 Martadinata class - 2 ships, modified Sigma class, frigate variant
 Arrowhead 140 frigate – 2 under construction

Iran 

 Alvand class - 3 ships
 Moudge class - 4 ships (2 more under construction)

Iraq (Iraqi Navy) 
 Ibn Khaldoum class - 1 ship, sunk in 2003
 Lupo class - 4 ships planned, seized by Italy

Italy (Marina Militare) 
 Centauro class - 4 ships
 Bergamini class - 4 ships
 Alpino class - 2 ships
 Lupo class - 4 ships
 Maestrale class - 8 ships
 Soldati class - 4 ships, originally built for Iraq
 FREMM Bergamini class - 10

Japan (Japanese Maritime Self-Defense Force) 
 Wakaba class - 1 ship decommissioned 1971
 Asahi class - 2 ship all decommissioned 1975
 Akebono class - 1 ship decommissioned 1976
 Ikazuchi class - 2 ships decommissioned 1976 & 1977
 Isuzu class - 4 ships all decommissioned 1991 to 1993
 Chikugo class - 11 ships all decommissioned 1996 to 2003
 Ishikari class - 1 ship decommissioned 2007
 Yūbari class - 2 ships all decommissioned 2010
 Abukuma class - 6 ships commissioned 1989 to 1993
 Mogami class - 4 ships in construction as of September 2021

Libya (Libyan Navy)
 Dat Assawari 1 ship commissioned 1973 (scrapped)
 Koni class 2 ships (1 in service)

Malaysia (Royal Malaysian Navy) 
 Maharaja Lela - 6 ships (6 planned, 4 building)
 Lekiu class - 2 ships
 Hang Tuah class - 1 ship (retired)
 Loch class — 1 ship (retired)
 Rahmat class - 1 ship (retired)

Mexico 
 Allende class - 4 ships (ex-US Knox class)
 Bravo class - 2 ships (ex-US Bronstein class)

Montenegro 
 Kotor class - 2 ships

Morocco
 Mohammed V class - 2 ships (Floreal class)

Myanmar (Myanmar Navy)
 River class - 1 ship (ex-UK HMS Fal)
 Mahar Bandoola class - 2 ships (Type 053H1 class)
 Aung Zeya class - 1 ship
 Kyan Sittha - 2 ships

Netherlands (Koninklijke Marine) 
 Van Amstel class - 6 ships, 1954 (former United States Navy Cannon class)
 Van Speijk class - 6 ships, 1967-1968 (modified Leander class)
 Tromp class - 2 ships, 1975–1976
 Kortenaer class - 10 ships, 1978–1983
 Jacob van Heemskerck class - 2 ships, 1986
 Karel Doorman class - 8 ships, 1991–1995
 De Zeven Provinciën class - 4 ships, 2001–2005

New Zealand (Royal New Zealand Navy) 
 Loch class — 6 ships - decommissioned 
 Anzac-class frigate - 2 ships - in service since 1997
 Type 12W - 1 ship - decommissioned
 Type 12M - 2 ships - decommissioned 
 Type 12L (Leander class) - 4 ships - decommissioned

Norway (Royal Norwegian Navy) 
 Oslo class - 5 ships all decommissioned
 Fridtjof Nansen class, modified version of Álvaro de Bazán class - 5 ships delivered (2011)

North Korea 
 Soho class - 1 ship
 Najin class - 2 ships

Pakistan (Pak Behria) 
 Tariq class - 6 ships (ex-UK Amazon class) - 2 decommissioned
 Zulfiquar class - 4 ships, 2 being built
 Type 054AP - 4 being built
 Jinnah class - 4 being built
 Alamgir class - 1 ship (ex-US (Oliver Hazard Perry class))

Peru (Marina de Guerra del Perú) 
 Modified Lupo class - 4 ships
 Lupo class - 4 ships

Philippines (Hukbong Dagat ng Pilipinas) 
 Buckley class - 1 ship (1960-1964)
 Datu Kalantiaw class - 3 ships (1967-2018)
 Edsall class - 1 ship (1976-1988)
 Andrés Bonifacio class - 4 ships (1976-1993)
 Gregorio del Pilar class - 3 ships (2011-present)
 Jose Rizal class - 2 ships (2020-present)

Poland (Marynarka Wojenna) 
 General K. Pulaski class - 2 ships (ex-US Oliver Hazard Perry class)

Portugal Navy (Marinha Portuguesa) 
 Joao Belo class - 3 ships
 Vasco da Gama class - 3 ships
 Bartolomeu Dias-class frigate - 2 ships
 Admiral Pereira da Silva class - 3 ships

Romania (Forțele Navale Române) 
 Type 22 class - 2 ships
 Mărăşeşti class - 1 ship
 Rear-Admiral Eustațiu Sebastian class - 2 ships

Russia/USSR (Voyenno- Morskoy Flot) 

 Admiral Grigorovich class - 4 ships (6 planned)
 Admiral Gorshkov class - 3 ships (8 planned)
 Neustrashimy class - 2 ships.
 Legky class - 2 ships
 Bessmenny class - 10 ships; possible 4 still active as of 2008
 Bditelny class - 19 ships; possibly 4 still active as of 2008
 Koni class - 1 ship sold to Bulgaria
 Mirka class - 18 ships all decommissioned
 Petya class - 37 ships 8 still active as of 2008; 6 Vietnamese & 2 Syrian.
 Riga class - 68 ships built 1950's sold to various navies
 Kola class - 8 ships all decommissioned
 Gepard class - 2 ship in service

Saudi Arabia (Saudi Navy) 
 Al Riyadh class - 3 ships building ( a version of the La Fayette class)
 Al Madinah class - 4 ships

Singapore (Republic of Singapore Navy) 
 Formidable class - 6 ships commissioned 2007-2009

South Africa (South African Navy) 
 Loch class — 3 ships (no longer in service)
 President class - 3 ships (no longer in service - 1 sunk & 2 scrapped)
 Valour class - 4 ships (also known as MEKO A200SAN)

South Korea (Republic of Korea Navy) 
 Incheon class - 6 ships
 Daegu class - 8 ships
 Ulsan class - 9 ships

Spain (Armada Española) 
 Marte class - 2 ships
 Jupiter class - 2 ships
 Eolo class - 2 ships
 Pizarro class - 8 ships
 Atrevida class - 6 ships
 Baleares class - 5 ships (modified Knox class)
 Santa Maria class - 6 ships (Oliver Hazard Perry class, built in Ferrol, Spain.)
 Álvaro de Bazán class - 5 ships

Republic of China (Taiwan) (Republic of China Navy) 
 Cheng Kung class - 7 ships
 Kang Ding class - 6 ships
 Chi Yang class - 8 ships (ex-US Knox class)
 Chien Yang class - 12 ships

Thailand (Royal Thai Navy) 
 Pin Klao class - 1 ship
 Makut Rajakumarn class - 1 ship
 Chao Phraya class - 2 ships (Type 053HT class)
 Kraburi class - 2 ships (Type 053HT-H class)
 Phutthayotfa Chulalok class - 2 ships (Knox class)
 Naresuan class - 2 ships
 Bhumibol Adulyadej class - 1 ship

Turkey (Türk Deniz Kuvvetleri) 
 Gaziantep class - 9 ships (Oliver Hazard Perry class)
 Muavenet class - 8 ships (Knox class)
 Tepe class - 4 ships (Knox class)
 Barbaros class - 2 ships
 Salihreis class - 2 ships (modified Barbaros class)
 Yavuz class - 4 ships
 Berk class - 2 ships

Ukraine (Ukrainian Navy)

Krivak-class frigate  — 1 ship

United Kingdom (Royal Navy) 
 River class — 151 ships
 Colony class — 21 ships
 Captain class — 78 ships
 Loch class — 24 ships
 Bay class — 21 ships
 Type 15 class— 23 ships
 Type 16 class— 10 ships
 Type 41 Leopard class — 4 ships
 Type 61 Salisbury class — 4 ships
 Type 12 Whitby class — 6 ships
 Type 12I Rothesay class — 9 ships
 Type 14 Blackwood class — 12 ships
 Type 81 Tribal class — 7 ships
 Type 12M Leander class (Batch 1) - 8 ships
 Type 12M Leander class (Batch 2) - 8 ships
 Type 12M broad-beamed Leander class (Batch 3) - 10 ships
 Type 21 Amazon class — 8 ships
 Type-22 Broadsword class (Batch 1) - 4 ships
 Type-22 Boxer class (Batch 2) - 6 ships
 Type-22 Cornwall class (Batch 3) - 4 ships
 Type 23 Duke class — 16 ships

United States (United States Navy) 
 United States class - 6 original frigates of the US Navy 1797 to present (USS Constitution)
 Bronstein class - 2 FF ships 1963 (Transfer to Mexico actual ARM Bravo Class)
 Garcia class - 10 FF ships and 1 AGFF ship 1964 to 1968
 Brooke class - 6 FFG ships 1966 to 1968
 Knox class - 46 FF ships 1969 to 1974
 Oliver Hazard Perry class - 51 FFG ships 1977 to 1989
 Constellation class - 1 ship on order with 20 being planned total

Uruguay (National Navy of Uruguay) 

 Uruguay class - 3 ships

Venezuela (Bolivarian Armada of Venezuela) 

 Mariscal Sucre class - 6 ships (ex-Italian Lupo class)

Vietnam (Vietnamese People's Navy) 

  - 1 ship (ex-seaplane tender)
 Petya class - 5 ships
 Dinh Tien Hoang class - 4 ships in service (2 on order)

Yugoslavia SFR Yugoslav Navy 

 Koni class - 2 ships
 Kotor class - 2 ships

See also

 List of frigate classes
 List of corvette classes

References

 Country